Gramercy Pictures was an American film production label. It was founded on May 20, 1992 as a joint venture between PolyGram Filmed Entertainment and Universal Pictures. Gramercy was the distributor of PolyGram films in the United States and Canada and also served as Universal's art-house division. After Seagram's buyout of PolyGram, Gramercy along with October Films were merged by Barry Diller to form USA Films in 1999. On May 20, 2015, Focus Features (the current art-house division for Universal) revived the name as a label for action, horror and sci-fi genre films; the label was shut down after the release of Ratchet & Clank on April 29, 2016.

History 
Gramercy Pictures was formed on May 20, 1992 as a joint venture between PolyGram Filmed Entertainment and Universal Pictures. Gramercy Pictures released its first film, the Mario Van Peebles western Posse, on May 14, 1993.

On January 11, 1996, PolyGram brought the 50% stake owned by Universal thus assuming full control of Gramercy. The distributor also had box office hits in 1994's Four Weddings and a Funeral, 1996's Fargo and 1997's Bean. Several Gramercy releases of the 1990s have grown in stature to become cult classics in the present day: The Big Lebowski, Dazed and Confused, Clay Pigeons and Mallrats. In addition, 1995's The Usual Suspects won two Oscars, for Best Original Screenplay (Christopher McQuarrie) and Best Supporting Actor (Kevin Spacey).

When Seagram acquired PolyGram on May 22, 1998, the latter was merged and folded into Universal; as a result, it reacquired Gramercy as it controlled Universal. In turn, Seagram sold the bulk of the PolyGram film library titles released up until March 31, 1996 to Metro-Goldwyn-Mayer in 1999, and later on, it sold Gramercy and another specialty division, October Films, to Barry Diller's USA Networks, which merged both companies into USA Films. USA Films was then merged with Universal's own art-house division, Universal Focus, and transformed into Focus Features in 2002 after Vivendi Universal acquired USA Networks from Diller.

Revival 
On May 20, 2015, Focus Features announced that the Gramercy label has been revived to release action, horror and sci-fi genre films. Its first release was Insidious: Chapter 3 on June 5, 2015. The revived label was later shut down following the box office failure of Ratchet & Clank.

Filmography

1990s

2000s

2010s

References 

 
Film distributors of the United States
Entertainment companies based in California
Cinema of Southern California
Companies based in Los Angeles County, California
American companies established in 1992
Entertainment companies established in 1992
Entertainment companies disestablished in 2001
1992 establishments in California
2001 disestablishments in California
Re-established companies
Entertainment companies established in 2015
Entertainment companies disestablished in 2016
2015 establishments in California
Joint ventures
Universal Pictures subsidiaries